John Oliver's New York Stand-Up Show is a stand-up comedy television series that aired on Comedy Central in the United States. Hosted by British-American comedian John Oliver, the show featured new material by both up-and-coming and established comedians. Each episode featured four performers including the headliner, with Oliver usually opening the show with a short set.

Episodes

Season 1 (2010)

Season 2 (2011)

Season 3 (2012)

Season 4 (2013)

References

External links

Comedy Central original programming
2010s American stand-up comedy television series
2010 American television series debuts
2013 American television series endings